The School of Optometry and Vision Science is one of the professional schools at the University of Waterloo. It is a school within the university's Faculty of Science and is the larger of the two optometry schools in Canada. The School is the only English speaking Optometry School in the country; the Francophone Université de Montréal program operates in Quebec.

History 
The University of Waterloo School of Optometry opened on July 1, 1967 (the Canadian Centennial). Before this time, optometrists were trained at the College of Optometry of Ontario in Toronto. The size of the program doubled once this affiliation with UW was established. Dr. Edward J. Fisher served as the new school's first dean until 1975. Fisher had been dean of the College of Optometry for 19 years beforehand, and from 1969 to 1970 he served as the 23rd President of the American Academy of Optometry, the first Canadian to serve in that capacity.

Classes and administrative offices were originally based in the Math and Computer building and the Biology 1 buildings at the University in Waterloo. A clinic was established in the old post office at 35 King Street North. In 1973, the Optometry building was built on the north side of Columbia Street, where lecture halls and clinic facilities were made available in one place.

Announced January 2006, as a new School of Medicine, the Waterloo Regional Campus of McMaster University was completed in 2009. Its Michael G. DeGroote School of Medicine building at King and Victoria St. in Kitchener includes a satellite clinic for the School of Optometry and Vision Science.

The Doctor of Optometry (OD) degree has been a four-year program since the 1950s at the College of Optometry of Ontario, where a Grade 13 high school education was sufficient for admission. Since then, the program has remained four years in length, but the curriculum has changed remarkably. Because of this, the prerequisite level of education has also changed: first from a minimum of one year of university science education, then a minimum of two years, now a minimum of three years of full-time study in a science degree program. 

Currently, a minimum of 3 years of full time study in a science degree program are required for admission into the 4 year professional program. However, most students choose to finish their undergraduate degree before entering Optometry school. There are several prerequisite courses, encompassing subjects such as biology, chemistry, physics, calculus, psychology and ethics that are required to be considered for admission.

Programs 
The four-year Doctor of Optometry (OD) program provides preparation for the practice of optometry, with both classroom instruction and hands-on clinical experience. In order to practice optometry, graduates from the OD program must pass both the written and oral Canadian Board Exams, as well as writing the jurisprudence licensing exam for their home province. Classes cover topics such as general medicine, optics, pharmacology, ocular disease, visual perception, practice management and more. Extensive clinical experience is provided starting in first year of the intensive program. The fourth year of the program is entirely clinical, consisting of 3 consecutive terms of clinical rotations: ocular disease externship, private practice experience and rotation through UW's speciality clinics.

Graduate studies in Vision Science (MSc, PhD) are available at the School of Optometry and Vision Science. The MSc program was established in 1972 and the PhD program began in 1980. Both are open to graduates from optometry and from other undergraduate programs. The programs are designed to further knowledge in specific aspects of vision, and often this involves integration with the other sciences. A combined Doctor of Optometry–Master of Science in Vision Science option exists as well; this is typically a five-year program.

The School of Optometry also offers ACOE accredited residencies in areas such as binocular vision, low vision, cornea/contact lenses and ocular health. Residencies are available for licence OD's who wish to advance their clinical knowledge in a specialty practice area.

The International Optometric Bridging Program (IOBP) is a new program designed for optometrists trained outside Canada and the USA, to help learning the language, academic, and clinical skills needed to practise in Canada. After an initial assessment of credentials, applicants undergo a month-long orientation program and a year-long academic program. This is designed to adequately prepare internationally trained optometrists for the Canadian Standard Assessment in Optometry, the national Board exam required to practise optometry in Canada.

Annually, a Continuing Education (CE) program is offered to practising ODs which provides approximately 20 or more certified hours of CE credit.

Admission to the Doctor of Optometry Program 
In 2005, eighty students were admitted to the program; in 2006, that number has increased to 85. Currently the entering class size is limited to 90 students. Due to the fact that UW is the only English speaking School of Optometry in Canada, admissions tend to be quite competitive. 

In past years, the average cGPA of the entering class has been 87% (range 80-96) There are 19 pre-requisite courses and labs, all of which must be completed by the term prior to commencing the optometry program. Pre-requisites include: 2 terms of general biology with labs, 1 term of microbiology, 2 terms of physiology, 1 term of general chemistry with lab, 1 term of biochemistry, 1 term of organic chemistry, 2 terms of physics with labs, 1 term of calculus, 1 term of statistics, and 1 term each of introductory psychology, English and ethics. 

Applicants are required to write the OAT by August 31st of the year prior to admission. The average Total Science OAT score of successful applicants has been 370 (90th percentile or above). A detailed online application with references must be completed during the fall of the year prior to admission. Applicants are expected to have experience job shadowing an optometrist in addition to community involvement, extracurriculars and volunteering. After an initial review of the candidates, the admissions committee selects applicants for an interview. The interview is held in January at the School of Optometry. The 90 successful candidates are notified via email by the end of March with the admissions decision.

Clinics 
The School also operates the University of Waterloo Optometry Clinics which are open to staff, students, and faculty of the University of Waterloo and the general public. The clinics are staffed by interns, residents, and graduates of the School operating under the supervision of faculty or other licensed optometrists, allowing optometry students to gain patient care experience as well as providing vision care services to the community. Speciality clinics include ocular health, contact lens, low vision, binocular vision, paediatrics, sports vision and more.

The main clinic operates from the School of Optometry's building on the University of Waterloo's main campus, with a smaller clinic providing basic services also located at the Health Sciences Campus in downtown Kitchener.

Research and Graduate Studies 
Vision science is a cross-discipline study encompassing biology, chemistry, physics, engineering, psychology, and medicine, in both laboratory and clinical settings.  The areas of research at the School  have been defined as:
 Biomedical Ocular Research
 Contact Lenses
 Low Vision Rehabilitation
 Optometric Education and Practice
 Vision & Ophthalmic Standards
 Visual Development & Refractive Correction

The Optometry building is equipped with research laboratories supported by metal, wood, electronic and optical workshops, a vision science library centre, histology and live-animal housing facilities.  Researchers also have controlled access to clinic data and subjects.

The School boasts two centres of research excellence:
 the Centre for Sight Enhancement (Low Vision Services) - services and research for blind and visually impaired individuals
 the Centre for Contact Lens Research - researching various types of contact lenses and solutions, and their effects on the eye

Museum of Vision Science
The Museum of Vision Science is a museum located within the school, with physical and virtual displays of vision-related devices and instruments. It has free admission, and is open on weekdays. In June 2009, it was relocated to its present location after the completion of the new wing of the optometry building.

References

External links 
School of Optometry and Vision Science
Witer Learning Resource Centre
Centre for Contact Lens Research
Centre for Sight Enhancement

Optometry
Optometry schools
1967 establishments in Ontario